Ivor R. Davies (1901 – 10 May 1970) was an English composer, organist, and organ builder. He won the Royal Academy of Music's Lucas Prize in 1926. Aside from various anthems for church use, his best known work is the 1967 SATB choral cycle Prayers from the Ark, which sets six of the 27 poems from the collection by Carmen Bernos de Gasztold.

References

English composers
English organists
British male organists
1901 births
1970 deaths
20th-century organists
20th-century British male musicians